Merrifieldia semiodactylus is a moth of the family Pterophoridae found on Corsica and Sardinia.

The larvae feed on apple mint (Mentha suaveolens insularis).

References

semiodactylus
Moths described in 1855
Plume moths of Europe
Taxa named by Josef Johann Mann